It's About Time is the debut studio album by American garage punk band the Pandoras and was released in 1984 by the Voxx record label.

Reception 

In a retrospective review for the AllMusic website, critic Dean Carlson described the album as one that "shines in its muddily produced, tonally confident swagger" and "avoids the sputter of careerist garage rock for a spectacularly bleary haunted house feel." Carlson summed up by calling the album, "one of 1984's best garage-punk releases." Scott Schinder and Ira Robbins, writing for Trouser Press, called it, "as good a '60s punk record as any contemporary combo is likely to make".

Track listing
All songs written by Paula Pierce unless otherwise noted.

Side one
"It's About Time"
"I Want Him"
"James"
"He's Not Far"
"Haunted Beach Party" (Herb Gross)

Side two
"I Live My Life"
"Want Need Love"
"It Just Ain't True"
"High On A Cloud" (Mike Carol)
"Cry On My Own"
"Going His Way"

Personnel

 Paula Pierce - Lead Guitar, Vocals, Harmonica
 Bambi Conway - Bass Guitar, Background Vocals
 Gwynne (Kelly) Kahn - Rhythm Guitar, Organ, Background Vocals
 Casey Gomez - Drums

References

External links 

 

1984 debut albums
The Pandoras albums